Marco Torrès (22 January 1888 – 15 January 1963), born in Sidi Bel Abbès, French Algeria, was a French gymnast who competed in two Summer Olympic Games - the 1912 Summer Olympics, where he finished seventh in the individual all-around competition and in the 1920 Summer Olympics, where he placed 2nd in the all-around and helped his team to a bronze medal.

He also had tremendous success at the World Artistic Gymnastics Championships where he led his French team to victory in 1909 and where he became one of only 7 male gymnasts in history to become individual World All-Around Champion twice (1909 and 1913).  He was also a formidable rival for Josef Čada, also World All-Around Champion (in 1907).  Čada was twice World Champion on High Bar in 1911 and 1913, preceded by a silver on the apparatus in 1909; Torres placed just behind Čada on the apparatus, winning silver in 1911, but tying Čada for the title in 1913.

One of the very most successful of the earliest crops of career gymnasts at the World and Olympic level, additionally, like Čada, Torres was one of the few pre-World War I gymnasts who continued to compete (successfully) after the war.

References

External links 
 
 

1888 births
1963 deaths
French male artistic gymnasts
Olympic gymnasts of France
Gymnasts at the 1912 Summer Olympics
Gymnasts at the 1920 Summer Olympics
Olympic silver medalists for France
Olympic bronze medalists for France
Olympic medalists in gymnastics
Medalists at the 1920 Summer Olympics
People from Sidi Bel Abbès
Pieds-Noirs
French people of Spanish descent
20th-century French people
Migrants from French Algeria to France